Unterensingen is a municipality in the district of Esslingen in Baden-Württemberg in southern Germany.

Geography
It is located 19 km southeast of Stuttgart.

References

Esslingen (district)
Populated places on the Neckar basin
Populated riverside places in Germany